Cazzie Laurel David (born May 10, 1994) is an American scriptwriter and actress. David co-created and co-starred in the web series Eighty-Sixed (2017). Her first collection of essays No One Asked For This was released in 2020. She also appears in the third season of Netflix's The Umbrella Academy.

Early life and education
David was born in 1994 to comedian and Seinfeld co-creator Larry David and environmental activist and film producer Laurie David. Her family is Jewish. She has one younger sister named Romy David. David earned a Bachelor of Arts degree in writing for film and television from Emerson College in 2016.

Career
David and co-writer Elisa Kalani created the web series Eighty-Sixed, which ran for eight episodes. David and Kalani then developed Half-Empty for Amazon Prime Video. The show was picked up for a pilot episode in 2019, but ultimately was not developed into a series.

David released the collection of essays No One Asked For This in 2020, which reached #2 on The New York Times Paperback Nonfiction Best Sellers List.

Personal life
David dated comedian Pete Davidson for two and a half years until 2018.

Filmography

Television

References

External links

Living people
1994 births
Emerson College alumni
American actresses
American people of German-Jewish descent
Place of birth missing (living people)
American people of Polish-Jewish descent
Jewish American actresses
21st-century American Jews
21st-century American women